Coccoloba is a genus of about 120–150 species of flowering plants in the family Polygonaceae, which is native to the Neotropics. There is no overall English name for the genus, although many of the individual species have widely used common names.

Range
The genus is native to tropical and subtropical regions of the Americas, in South America, the Caribbean and Central America, with two species extending into Florida.

Description
The species are shrubs and trees, and lianas, mostly evergreen. The flowers are produced in spikes. The fruit is a three-angled achene, surrounded by an often brightly coloured fleshy perianth, edible in some species, though often astringent. Species in the genus have been characterized as dioecious, but this is unclear. Trioecy has been documented in C. cereifera.

Selected species 
Coccoloba acuminata 
Coccoloba barbadensis – Uvero
Coccoloba caracasana – Papaturro
Coccoloba cereifera
Coccoloba costata – Uvilla
Coccoloba diversifolia – Pigeonplum
Coccoloba gigantifolia (with human-sized leaves)
Coccoloba goldmanii
Coccoloba krugii – Whitewood seagrape
Coccoloba microstachya – Puckhout
Coccoloba mollis
Coccoloba padiformis
Coccoloba pallida – Pale seagrape
Coccoloba pauciflora – Uvilla cimarrona
Coccoloba pubescens – Grandleaf seagrape
Coccoloba pyrifolia – Uvera
Coccoloba rugosa – Ortegon
Coccoloba sintenisii – Uvero de monte
Coccoloba swartzii – Swartz's pigeonplum
Coccoloba tenuifolia – Bahama pigeonplum
Coccoloba tuerckheimii
Coccoloba uvifera – Seagrape
Coccoloba venosa – False chiggergrape
Sources:

Ecology
The species Coccoloba cereifera is notable for being restricted to an area of only some 26 square km on a single low peak near Serra do Cipó National Park, in the Brazilian state of Minas Gerais.

Cultivation and uses
One species, Coccoloba uvifera (Seagrape) is commonly cultivated for its edible fruit, and the genus name is sometimes used to denote this species.

References

External links
  
 

 
Polygonaceae genera
Neotropical realm flora